The 2022–23 season is the 104th season in the history of Angers SCO and their eighth consecutive season in the top flight. The club are participating in Ligue 1 and the Coupe de France. The season covers the period from 1 July 2022 to 30 June 2023.

Players

First-team squad

Transfers

In

Out

Pre-season and friendlies

Competitions

Overall record

Ligue 1

League table

Results summary

Results by round

Matches 
The league fixtures were announced on 17 June 2022.

Coupe de France

References

Angers SCO seasons
Angers